is a Japanese manga series written and illustrated by Etsushi Ogawa. It was serialized in Kodansha's Comic Bom Bom, which was aimed at elementary-aged boys. The manga received the 2007 Kodansha Manga Award for the children's category.

Kunimi Satoshi stayed at home and did nothing for a year after his father had gone missing. However meeting with his classmate, Tsuji Keita, he somehow manage to graduate middle school, and to become a master chef, he decide to work in Teito hotel, one of highest hotel known for cooking.

References

External links

2006 manga
Children's manga
Cooking in anime and manga
Kodansha manga
Shōnen manga
Winner of Kodansha Manga Award (Children)